Cajabamba is a town in Northern Peru and is the capital of the province of Cajabamba, in the region of Cajamarca.

References

Populated places in the Cajamarca Region